Following is a list of Sigma Phi Delta chapters. Active chapters are indicated in bold. Inactive chapters are in italic.

Notes

External links
ΣΦΔ homepage

Lists of chapters of United States student societies by society
chapters